Picnic at Hanging Rock is a 1975 Australian mystery film produced by Hal and Jim McElroy, directed by Peter Weir, and starring Rachel Roberts, Dominic Guard, Helen Morse, Vivean Gray and Jacki Weaver. It was adapted by Cliff Green from the 1967 novel of the same name by Joan Lindsay.

The plot involves the disappearance of several schoolgirls and their teacher during a picnic at Hanging Rock, Victoria on Valentine's Day in 1900, and the subsequent effect on the local community. Picnic at Hanging Rock was a commercial and critical success, and helped draw international attention to the then-emerging Australian New Wave of cinema.

Plot
At Appleyard College, a girls' private school near the town of Woodend in Victoria, Australia, students are getting ready on the morning of Valentine's Day, 1900. One student, an orphan named Sara, has a deep connection with her elder roommate Miranda. The school's austere headmistress, Mrs Appleyard, has arranged a picnic to a local geological formation known as Hanging Rock, accompanied by the peculiar mathematics teacher Miss Greta McCraw and the young French teacher Mademoiselle de Poitiers. Mrs Appleyard keeps Sara and jittery teacher Miss Lumley at the college.

Buggy operator Ben Hussey gets the group to Hanging Rock by mid-afternoon, where they picnic at its base. Mr Hussey notes his pocket watch has stopped at the stroke of 12, as has Miss McCraw's. With permission from Mlle. de Poitiers, Miranda and classmates Marion, Irma, and Edith decide to explore Hanging Rock. The group is soon after observed crossing a creek by a young Englishman, Michael Fitzhubert, along with Albert, his friend and coachman for the Fitzhubert family.

After exploring the rock for a while, Miranda, Marion, and Irma remove their shoes and stockings. Near the summit, seemingly under the influence of an unseen force, the four collapse and fall asleep next to a  monolith. Everyone at the picnic spot is apparently asleep as well, except for Miss McCraw who looks at a geometry textbook and up at the Rock. The four awaken synchronously and, as if in a trance, all except Edith move up into a crevice. Witnessing this, Edith screams and flees down the Rock in terror.

When the party returns to the college a few hours late and hysterical, Mrs Appleyard notes that Miss McCraw is absent. Mr. Hussey explains that they all woke up to Edith's screams and, along with the three students, Miss McCraw was nowhere to be found. Sara is especially devastated by the disappearance due to her connection with Miranda. A search party conducted by the local police finds no trace of them, although Edith reveals that she witnessed Miss McCraw climbing the rock in only undergarments, as well as an odd red cloud. Michael Fitzhubert is questioned and informs that he briefly saw the schoolgirls, but can provide no clues as to their whereabouts.

Michael becomes obsessed with the mystery, deciding to conduct his own search of Hanging Rock along with Albert. After finding nothing, Michael decides to remain overnight and begins searching again the next day. He too eventually collapses, hearing bits of conversation from the picnic and having a vision of the girls going into the crevice, up to which he drags himself. Albert returns, finding Michael nearly catatonic. He gets help and Michael is carried down to a carriage. As he departs, Michael passes Albert a fragment of lace he had clenched in his hand. Albert again ascends Hanging Rock and discovers Irma unconscious but somehow alive.

Mrs Appleyard advises Miss Lumley that the mystery is devastating the school's reputation, bringing to her attention that several parents have withdrawn their children. Unrest spreads among locals about the mystery and school. At the Fitzhubert home, where Irma is treated for dehydration, a medical examination strangely shows only minor injuries. A servant girl notes that Irma's corset is missing. Irma tells the police and Mlle. de Poitiers that she has no memory of what happened.

Mrs Appleyard notifies Sara that her presence at the college is endangered, as her guardian has not been keeping up with payments or communication. Increasingly despondent due to this and her loss of Miranda, Sara reveals to a maid that she was in an orphanage with her brother before being able to come to the college through her guardian, describing how she was abused by the matron. She also tells Mlle. de Poitiers that Miranda knew she would vanish forever.

During an exercise class, Irma arrives to bid farewell to her classmates, who violently swarm her, demanding that she reveal what happened on the rock and where the missing girls are. As everyone exits crying, Mlle. de Poitiers finds Sara feeble and strapped to a posture correction board. Afterward, Miss Lumley gives notice to a drunken Mrs Appleyard that she is resigning. Mrs Appleyard goes to Sara's room that night and informs her that, as her guardian has still not paid her tuition, she will be returned to the orphanage, then weeps in her office while Sara leaves her room.

The next day, Albert reveals to Michael that he had a dream in which his lost sister, revealed to be Sara, visited him. Meanwhile, Mrs Appleyard claims that Sara's guardian came to pick her up early that morning. The students then depart for their holiday, and at dinner with Mlle. de Poitiers, an unhinged Mrs Appleyard spitefully rages about Miss McCraw and Hanging Rock. In the morning, Sara's body is found by the school gardener in a small greenhouse, apparently having plummeted into it from the school's rooftop. He goes into Mrs Appleyard's office to inform her but is rendered nearly speechless as she is in full mourning dress with her possessions packed, unresponsively staring.

During a flashback to the picnic, a police sergeant states in a voiceover that Mrs Appleyard's body was later found at the base of Hanging Rock, apparently having fallen, and that the search for Miranda, Marion, and Miss McCraw continued for several years without success, their disappearance remaining a mystery.

Cast

 Rachel Roberts as Mrs Appleyard
 Dominic Guard as Michael Fitzhubert
 Helen Morse as Mlle. de Poitiers
 Jacki Weaver as Minnie
 Anne-Louise Lambert as Miranda St. Clare
 Margaret Nelson as Sara Waybourne
 John Jarratt as Albert Crundall 
 Wyn Roberts as Sgt Bumpher
 Karen Robson as Irma Leopold
 Christine Schuler as Edith Horton
 Jane Vallis as Marion Quade
 Vivean Gray as Miss McCraw
 Martin Vaughan as Ben Hussey
 Kirsty Child as Miss Lumley
 Frank Gunnell as Mr Whitehead 
 Tony Llewellyn-Jones as Tom
 John Fegan as Doc. McKenzie
 Kay Taylor as Mrs Bumpher 
 Peter Collingwood as Col. Fitzhubert
 Garry McDonald as Const. Jones
 Olga Dickie as Mrs Fitzhubert
 Jenny Lovell as Blanche

Production

The novel was published in 1967.  Reading it four years later, Patricia Lovell thought it would make a great film. She did not originally think of producing it herself until Phillip Adams suggested she try it; she optioned the film rights in 1973, paying $100 for three months. She hired Peter Weir to direct on the basis of his film Homesdale, and Weir brought in Hal and Jim McElroy to help produce.

Screenwriter David Williamson originally was chosen to adapt the film, but was unavailable and recommended noted TV writer Cliff Green. Joan Lindsay had approval over who did the adaptation and she gave it to Green, whose first draft Lovell says was "excellent".

The finalised budget was A$440,000, coming from the Australian Film Development Corporation, British Empire Films and the South Australian Film Corporation. $3,000 came from private investors.

Filming

Filming began in February 1975 with principal photography taking six weeks. Locations included Hanging Rock in Victoria, Martindale Hall near Mintaro in rural South Australia, and at the studio of the South Australian Film Corporation in Adelaide.

To achieve the look of an Impressionist painting for the film, director Weir and director of cinematography Russell Boyd were inspired by the work of British photographer and film director David Hamilton, who had draped different types of veils over his camera lens to produce diffused and soft-focus images. Boyd created the ethereal, dreamy look of many scenes by placing simple bridal veil fabric of various thicknesses over his camera lens. The film was edited by Max Lemon.

Casting
Weir originally cast Ingrid Mason as Miranda, but realised after several weeks of rehearsals that it was "not working" and cast Anne-Louise Lambert. Mason was persuaded to remain in the role of a minor character by producer Patricia Lovell. The role of Mrs. Appleyard was originally to have been taken by Vivien Merchant; Merchant fell ill and Rachel Roberts was cast at short notice. Several of the schoolgirls' voices were dubbed in secret by professional voice actors, as Weir had cast the young actresses for their innocent appearance rather than their acting ability. The voice actors were not credited, although more than three decades later, actress Barbara Llewellyn revealed that she had provided the voice for all the dialogue of Edith (Christine Schuler, now Christine Lawrance).

Music
The main title music was derived from two traditional Romanian panpipe pieces: "Doina: Sus Pe Culmea Dealului" and "Doina Lui Petru Unc" with Romanian Gheorghe Zamfir playing the panpipe (or panflute) and Swiss born Marcel Cellier the organ. Australian composer Bruce Smeaton also provided several original compositions (The Ascent Music and The Rock) written for the film.

Other classical additions included Bach's Prelude No. 1 in C from The Well-Tempered Clavier performed by Jenő Jandó; the Romance movement from Mozart's Eine kleine Nachtmusik; the Andante Cantabile movement from Tchaikovsky's String Quartet No. 1, Op. 11, and the Adagio un poco mosso from Beethoven's Piano Concerto No. 5 "Emperor" performed by István Antal with the Hungarian State Symphony Orchestra. Traditional British songs God Save the Queen and Men of Harlech also appear.

There is currently no official soundtrack commercially available. In 1976, CBS released a vinyl LP titled "A Theme from Picnic at Hanging Rock", a track of the same name and "Miranda's Theme". A 7" single was released in 1976 of the Picnic at Hanging Rock theme by the Nolan-Buddle Quartet. The song peaked at number 15 on the Australian singles chart.

An album Flute de Pan et Orgue (Music from Picnic at Hanging Rock) was released by Festival Records France.

Release
The film premiered on 8 August 1975, at the Hindley Cinema Complex in Adelaide. It was well received by audiences and critics alike.

Reception

Weir recalled that when the film was first screened in the United States, American audiences were disturbed by the fact that the mystery remained unsolved. According to Weir, "One distributor threw his coffee cup at the screen at the end of it, because he'd wasted two hours of his life—a mystery without a goddamn solution!" Critic Vincent Canby noted this reaction among audiences in a 1979 review of the film, in which he discussed the film's elements of artistic "Australian horror romance", albeit one without the cliches of a conventional horror film.

Despite this, the film was a critical success, with American film critic Roger Ebert calling it "a film of haunting mystery and buried sexual hysteria" and remarked that it "employs two of the hallmarks of modern Australian films: beautiful cinematography and stories about the chasm between settlers from Europe and the mysteries of their ancient new home."

Cliff Green stated in interview that "Writing the film and later through its production, did I—or anyone else—predict that it would become Australia's most loved movie? We always knew it was going to be good—but that good? How could we?"

Picnic at Hanging Rock currently has an approval rating of 91% on Rotten Tomatoes based on 43 reviews, with an average rating of 8.4/10. The site's critical consensus reads: "Visually mesmerizing, Picnic at Hanging Rock is moody, unsettling, and enigmatic -- a masterpiece of Australian cinema and a major early triumph for director Peter Weir". Metacritic, another review aggregator, gives the film a score of 81/100 based on 15 critics, indicating "universal acclaim".

Box office
Picnic at Hanging Rock grossed $5,120,000 in box office sales in Australia.

Accolades

Versions
In 1998, Weir removed seven minutes from the film for a theatrical re-release, creating a shorter 107-minute director's cut.

Home Video
The director's cut was released on DVD in the US by the Criterion Collection on 3 November 1998. This release featured a new transfer of the film, a theatrical trailer and liner notes. The Criterion Collection released the director's cut on Blu-ray in the US on 17 June 2014. It includes a paperback copy of the novel and a number of featurettes.

In the UK, the film was released in a special 3-disc DVD set on 30 June 2008. This set included both the director's cut and the longer original cut, the feature-length documentary A Dream Within a Dream, deleted scenes, interviews with the filmmakers and the book's author Joan Lindsay, poster and still galleries,. UK distributor Second Sight Films released the film on Blu-ray in the UK on 26 July 2010.

In Australia it was released on DVD by Umbrella Entertainment in August 2007, and re-released in a 2-disc Collector's Edition in May 2011. This edition includes special features including theatrical trailers, poster and still galleries, documentaries and interviews with cast, crew and Joan Lindsay. It was released on Blu-ray in Australia by Umbrella Entertainment on 12 May 2010, including the feature-length documentary A Dream Within a Dream, a 25-minute on-set documentary titled A Recollection: Hanging Rock 1900 and the theatrical trailer.

Legacy and influence
Picnic at Hanging Rock was voted the best Australian film of all time by members of the Australian Film Institute, industry guilds and unions, film critics and reviewers, academics and media teachers, and Kookaburra Card members of the National Film and Sound Archive (NFSA), in a 1996 poll organized by the Victorian Centenary of Cinema Committee and the NFSA.

The film has gone on to inspire other more recent artists, who have come to regard the film for its themes as well as its unique visuals.

Director Sofia Coppola has borrowed heavily from Picnic at Hanging Rock for her productions of The Virgin Suicides and Marie Antoinette. Both films, like Picnic at Hanging Rock, deal extensively with themes of death and femininity as well as adolescent perceptions of love and sexuality.

American television writer Damon Lindelof said that the film was an influence on the second season of the television show The Leftovers.

See also
 Picnic at Hanging Rock (TV series)
 List of films set around Valentine's Day

References

External links

 
 
 
 Picnic at Hanging Rock at Oz Movies
 "Picnic at Hanging Rock Locations" - field guide to the locations used for filming at Hanging Rock, Victoria, Australia
 Picnic at Hanging Rock: What We See and What We Seem - an essay by Megan Abbott at the Criterion Collection
 "Picnic" collection National Film and Sound Archive
 Picnic at Hanging Rock - includes bibliography

1975 films
1970s mystery drama films
Australian drama films
Films based on Australian novels
Films about missing people
Picnic films
Films about sexual repression
Films directed by Peter Weir
Films scored by Bruce Smeaton
Films set in Victoria (Australia)
Films shot in South Australia
Films set in the Victorian era
Films set in colonial Australia
Valentine's Day in films
Films set in 1900
Films set in boarding schools
1975 drama films
1970s English-language films